Rugby union in Costa Rica is a minor, but growing sport.

Governing body
The governing body is the Federación de Rugby de Costa Rica which is not currently affiliated to the IRB.

History

In 2007, Costa Rica helped introduce the game into Guatemala, when the Jules Verne School in Guatemala and Liceo Francés from Costa Rica played one another.

In December, 2007, Costa Rica A & B sides participated in the First Central American Rugby cup. The other competing teams were Panama and Guatemala. Costa Rica A came first in this tournament, Panama 2nd, Guatemala 3rd, and Costa Rica B 4th.

See also  
 Costa Rica national rugby union team

References

External links
  Rugby Costa Rica
 Guatemala's Rugby Story